Michele Santopietro is an American actress best known for her recurring character JoJo Palmice on HBO's The Sopranos, from seasons 1 through to 4. Santopietro has also had guest lead and recurring appearances on television shows such as Law & Order, Law & Order SVU, Sex and the City and the CBS television series New York News.

Career
Santopietro played one of the lead characters, Laura, in the Lionsgate feature film Two Family House with Michael Rispoli and Kelly Macdonald. She also starred opposite Adrian Grenier in the feature film A Perfect Fit, and can be seen opposite Teri Polo and Barry Bostwick in the made-for-television film Love is a Four Letter Word.

She stars in The Donner Party (2009), alongside Crispin Glover, Christian Kane, Mark Boone Jr. and Clayne Crawford. The film is based on the historical Donner Party in 1846 and Santopietro plays Amanda McCutcheon. She has also voiced many television and radio commercials as well as video games, audio books, audio dramas, and promotional voice work for television including Discovery's Animal Planet Network and the Lifetime series Prom Queens.

References

External links

Michele Santopietro on YouTube

Year of birth missing (living people)
American film actresses
American people of Italian descent
American television actresses
Living people
21st-century American women